Events from the year 1986 in Iran.

Incumbents
 Supreme Leader: Ruhollah Khomeini 
 President: Ali Khamenei
 Prime Minister: Mir-Hossein Mousavi
 Chief Justice: Abdul-Karim Mousavi Ardebili

Events

Deaths

 27 February – Gholam-Hossein Banan.

See also
 Years in Iraq
 Years in Afghanistan

References

 
Iran
Years of the 20th century in Iran
1980s in Iran
Iran